Lovely Ilonka (German: Schön-Ilonka; Hungarian: Szép Ilonka) is a Hungarian fairy tale published in Ungarische Märchen by Elisabet Róna-Sklarek. Andrew Lang included it in The Crimson Fairy Book.

Source 
The tale was collected by Imre Veres in Orosháza, in dialect, and published in 1875 in Hungarian magazine , Vol. 4.

Synopsis 
A prince wanted to marry, but his father told him to wait, saying that he had not been allowed until he had won the golden sword he carried.

One day he met an old woman and asked her about the three bulrushes.  She asked him to stay the night and in the morning, she summoned all the crows in the world, but they had not heard.  Then he met an old man, who also had him stay the night.  In the morning, all the ravens in the world had not heard. He met another old woman, and she told him it was well that he greeted her, or he would have suffered a horrible death.  In the morning, she summoned magpies, and a crippled magpie led him to a great wall behind which were the three bulrushes.

He started to take them home, but one broke open.  A lovely maiden flew out, asked for water, and flew off when he had none.  He split the second, and the same thing happened.  He took great care of the third, not splitting it until he had reached a well.  With the water, she stayed, and they agreed to marry.

He took her to his father's country, where he left her with a swineherd while he went to get a carriage.  The swineherd threw her into a well and dressed up his daughter in her clothing.  The prince was distressed but brought back the swineherd's daughter, married her, and received a crown, becoming a king.

One day, he sent a coachman to the well where Ilonka had been drowned.  He saw a white duck, and then the duck vanished and a dirty woman appeared before him.  This woman got a place as a housemaid in the castle.  When she was not working, she spun:  her distaff and spindle turned on their own, and she was never out of flax to spin.  The queen, the swineherd's daughter wanted the distaff, but she would sell it only for a night in the king's chamber.  The queen agreed and gave her husband a sleeping draught.  Ilonka spoke to the king, but he did not respond, and she thought he was ashamed of her.  Then the queen wanted the spindle, Ilonka decided to try again, but again the king slept.

The third time, the queen made the same agreement for the flax, but two of the king's servants warned him, he refused everything, and when Ilonka appealed to him, he heard her.  He had the swineherd, his wife, and his daughter hung and married Ilonka.

Analysis

Tale type 
Hungarian scholarship classify the tale, according to the Aarne-Thompson-Uther Index, as type ATU 408, "The Love for Three Oranges", and ATU 425, "The Search for the Lost Husband".

The tale is related to type ATU 408, "The Love for Three Oranges" or Die Drei Citronenjungfrauen ("The Three Maidens in the Citron Fruits"). In some tales of the same type, the fruit maiden regains her human form and must bribe the false bride for three nights with her beloved.

Motifs 
The motif of the heroine or maiden buying or bribing her way to her husband's chamber for three nights from the false bride harks back to variants of general tale type ATU 425, "The Search for the Lost Husband", and ATU 425A, "The Animal as Bridegroom".

Scholar Linda Dégh suggested a common origin for tale types ATU 403 ("The Black and the White Bride"), ATU 408 ("The Three Oranges"), ATU 425 ("The Search for the Lost Husband"), ATU 706 ("The Maiden Without Hands") and ATU 707 ("The Three Golden Sons"), since "their variants cross each other constantly and because their blendings are more common than their keeping to their separate type outlines" and even influence each other.

The heroine's appearance 
According to Hungarian researcher , Hungarian variants of the tale type usually show the fairy maiden coming out of a plant ("növényből"). In addition, the Hungarian Folktale Catalogue (MNK) named the type A Három Nádszálkisasszony ("The Three Reed Maidens"), since the maidens come out of reeds instead of fruits. However, they may also appear out of eggs (in 5 variants) or from apples (in 3 variants).

Variants

Hungary 
The Hungarian Folktale Catalogue (MNK) listed 59 variants of type 408, A Három Nádszálkisasszony ("The Three Reed Maidens"), across Hungarian sources. On the other hand, scholar Hans-Jörg Uther remarks that the tale type is "quite popular" in this country, with 79 variants registered.

Fieldwork conducted in 1999 by researcher Zoltán Vasvári amongst the Palóc population found 3 variants of the tale type.

In this story, a prince marries a princess, the older sister of the Reed Maiden, but his brother only wants to marry "the most lovely, world-beautiful maiden". The prince asks his sister-in-law who this person could be, and she answers it is her elder sister, hidden with her two ladies-in-waiting in three reeds in a distant land. He releases the two ladies-in-waiting, but forgets to give them water. The prince finally releases the Reed Maiden and gives her the water. Later, before the Reed Maiden is married to the prince, a gypsy comes and replaces her.

In another variant by Elisabeth Rona-Sklárek, Das Waldfräulein ("The Maiden in the Woods"), a lazy prince strolls through the woods and sights a beautiful "Staude" (a perennial plant). He uses his knife to cut some of the plant and releases a maiden. Stunned by her beauty, he cannot fulfill her request for water and she disappears. The same thing happens again. In the third time, he gives some water to the fairy maiden and marries her. The fairy woman gives birth to twins, but the evil queen mother substitutes them for puppies. The babies, however, are rescued a pair of two blue woodpeckers and taken to the woods. When the king returns from war and sees the two animals, he banishes his wife to the woods.

Hungarian linguist  collected the tale A háromágú tölgyfa tündére ("The Fairy from Three-Branched Oak Tree"). A king goes hunting in the woods, but three animals plead for their lives (a deer, a hare and a fox). All three animals point to a magical oak tree with three branches and say, if the king break each of the branches, a maiden shall appear and request water to drink. With the first two branches, the maidens die, but the king gives water to the third one and decides to marry her. They both walk towards the castle and the king says the fairy maiden should wait on the tree. A witch sees the maiden, tricks her and tosses her deep in a well; she replaces the fairy maiden with her own daughter. He also cited two other variants: A tündérkisasszony és a czigányleány ("The Fairy Princess and the Gypsy Girl"), by Laszló Arányi, and A három pomarancs ("The Three Bitter Oranges"), by Jánós Érdelyi.

German philologist Heinrich Christoph Gottlieb Stier (de) collected a Hungarian variant from Münster titled Die drei Pomeranzen ("The Three Bitter Oranges"): an old lady gives three princely brothers a bitter orange each and warns them to crack open the fruit near a body of water. The first two princes disobey and inadvertently kill the maiden that comes out of the orange. Only the youngest prince opens near a city fountain and saves the fairy maiden. Later, a gypsy woman replaces the fairy maiden, who turns into a fish and a tree and later hides in a piece of wood. The tale was translated and published into English as The Three Oranges.

Hungarian ethnographer  collected the tale A gallyból gyött királykisasszony ("The Princess from the Tree Branch"): a prince that was hunting breaks three tree branches in the forest and a maiden appears. The prince takes her to a well to wait for him to return with his royal retinue. An ugly gypsy woman approaches the girl and throws her down the well, where she becomes a goldfish.

English scholar A. H. Wratislaw collected the tale The Three Lemons from a Hungarian-Slovenish source and published it in his Sixty Folk-Tales from Exclusively Slavonic Sources. In this tale, the prince goes on a quest for three lemons on a glass hill and is helped by three old Jezibabas on his way. When he finds the lemons and cracks open each one, a maiden comes out and asks if the prince has prepared a meal for her and a pretty dress for her to wear. When he saves the third maiden, she is replaced by a gypsy maidservant who sticks a golden pin in her hair and transforms the fruit maiden into a dove.

In another tale from Elek Benedek's collection, Les Trois Pommes ("The Three Apples"), translated by Michel Klimo, the king's three sons go on a quest for wives. They meet a witch who gives each of them an apple and warns them to open near a fountain. The two oldest princes forget her warning and the fairy maiden dies. The third one opens near a fountain and saves her. He asks her to wait near a tree. A "bohemiénne" arrives to drink from the fountain and shoves the fairy maiden down the well, where she becomes a little red fish. The bohemiénne substitutes the fairy maiden and requests the prince to catch the red fish. She then asks the cook to make a meal out of it and to burn every fish scale. However, a scale survives and becomes a tree. The bohemiénne notices the tree is her rival and asks for the tree to be felled down. Not every part of the tree is destroyed: the woodcutter hides away part of the wood to make a pot lid.

In the tale A Tökváros ("The Pumpkin Town" or "Squash City"), by Elek Benedek, the son of a poor woman is cursed by a witch that he may not finds a wife until he goes to Pumpkin city, or eats down three iron-baked loaves of bread. He asks his mother to bake the iron bread and goes his merry away. He finds three old women in his travels and gives each the bread. The third reveals the location of the City of Pumpkins and warns him to wait on three squashes in a garden, for, during three days, a maiden shall appear out of one on each day. He does exactly that and gains a wife. They leave town and stop by a well. He tells the pumpkin maiden to wait by the well while he goes home to get a wagon to carry them the rest of the way. Suddenly, an old gypsy woman pushes her into the well and takes her place. When the youth returns, he wonders what happened to her, but seems to accept her explanation. He bends to drink some water from the well, but the false bride convinces him not to. He sees a tulip in the well, plucks it and takes it home. When the youth and the false bride go to church, the maiden emerges from the tulip. One night, the youth awakes to see the pumpkin maiden in his room, discovers the truth and expels the old gypsy.

In a different variation of the tale type, A griffmadár leánya ("The Daughter of the Griffin Bird"), a prince asks his father for money to use on his journey, and the monarch tells his son he is not to return until he is married to the daughter of the griffin bird. The prince meets an old man in the woods who directs him to a griffin's nest, with five eggs. The prince grabs all five eggs and cracks them open, a girl in a beautiful dress appearing out of each one. Only the last maiden survives because the prince gave her water to drink. He tells the maiden to wait by the well, but a gypsy girl arrives and, seeing the egg girl, throws her in the well and takes her place. The maiden becomes a goldfish and later a tree.

In another tale with the egg, from Baranya, A tojásból teremtett lány ("The Girl who was created from an Egg"), the king asks his son to find a wife "just like his mother": "one who was never born, but created!" The prince, on his journeys, finds an egg on the road. He cracks open the egg and a maiden comes out of it; she asks for water to drink, but dies. This repeats with a second egg. With the third, the prince gives water to the egg-born maiden. He goes back to the castle to find her some clothes. While she awaits, a gypsy girl meets the egg maiden and throws her in the well. The gypsy maiden takes the place of the egg girl and marries the prince. Some time later, an old gypsy shows the prince a goldfish he found in the well.  The usual transformation sequence happens: the false queen wants to eat the fish; a fish scale falls to the ground and becomes a rosewood;  the gypsy wants the rosewood to be burnt down, but a splinter remains. At the end of the tale, the egg princess regains her human form and goes to a ceremony of kneading corn, and joins the other harvesters in telling stories to pass time. She narrates her life story and the king recognizes her.

Adaptations 
Another Hungarian variant of the tale was adapted into an episode of the Hungarian television series Magyar népmesék ("Hungarian Folk Tales") (hu), with the title A háromágú tölgyfa tündére ("The Fairy from the Oak Tree").

See also 
Black Bull of Norroway
East of the Sun and West of the Moon
The Enchanted Canary
The White Duck

Bibliography

References

External links 
Lovely Ilonka

Female characters in fairy tales
Hungarian fairy tales
ATU 400-459
ATU 700-749